The Air Accident Investigation Unit (AAIU) is part of the Department of Transport of Ireland, and is responsible for the investigation of aircraft accidents and serious incidents within Ireland, and Irish-registered aircraft outside the jurisdiction.

The Air Accident Investigation Unit has its head offices at the Department of Transport buildings on Leeson Lane in Dublin. It was previously located at Transport House in Dublin.

Gallery

See also

 2017 Irish Coast Guard S-92 crash
 Irish Aviation Authority
 Manx2 Flight 7100
 Railway Accident Investigation Unit

References

External links
 Air Accident Investigation Unit website
 

Republic of Ireland
Transport in the Republic of Ireland
Government agencies of the Republic of Ireland
Aviation organisations based in Ireland